Afadin is a protein that in humans is encoded by the AFDN gene.

Function 

Afadin is a Ras (see HRAS; MIM 190020) target that regulates cell–cell adhesions downstream of Ras activation. It is fused with MLL (MIM 159555) in leukemias caused by t(6;11) translocations (Taya et al., 1998).[supplied by OMIM]

Interactions 

Afadin has been shown to interact with:

 BCR gene, 
 EPHB3, 
 F11 receptor, 
 HRAS and 
 LMO2, 
 PVRL1, 
 PVRL3, 
 Profilin 1, 
 RAP1A, 
 RAP1GAP, 
 SORBS1, 
 SSX2IP,
 Tight junction protein 1,  and
 USP9X.

References

Further reading